Comatrana is a town in Ica Province, Peru, located 3 kilometres from Ica. Landmarks of note include the San José de Madres Carmelitas Descalzas Monastery and the Comatrana Temple.

Barrios
Comatrana is divided administratively into the following barrios:

 Alto Comatrana
 Los Juárez
 La Victoria
 Los Nascas
 El Huarango
 El Espino

Populated places in the Ica Region